Hangzhoudong (Hangzhou East) railway station is a railway station located in Shangcheng District, Hangzhou, Zhejiang, People's Republic of China. Originally built as a small station serving the Shanghai-Kunming railway, it has been rebuilt as a high-speed rail hub, which became operational on 1 July 2013.

History

The old station opened in 1992, located on Tiancheng Road. It was closed on 20 January 2010, and demolished. Its train services were moved to Hangzhou railway station and Hangzhou South railway station.

A new station was built on the site. It officially opened on 1 July 2013, in conjunction with the opening of the Hangzhou–Ningbo High-Speed Railway and Nanjing–Hangzhou Passenger Railway. The station also serves the Shanghai–Hangzhou Passenger Railway. It has 30 railway tracks, and stations for Hangzhou Metro lines 1 and 4. A coach station and bus terminals are also part of the new transit hub.

Metro station

Lines 1 & 4

Hangzhou East railway station is served by a station of the same name on Line 1 and Line 4 of Hangzhou Metro. This station offers paired cross-platform interchange for passengers riding between 4 directions of the two lines.

Line 6 & 19

The metro station for Line 6 and Line 19 is a separated station called "East Railway Station (East Square)".

Around the station
 Hangzhou Mosque

See also
Hangzhou railway station
Hangzhou South railway station

References

Railway stations in China opened in 1992
Railway stations in Zhejiang
Stations on the Shanghai–Kunming Railway
Stations on the Nanjing–Hangzhou High-Speed Railway
Hangzhou Metro stations